Daniel Alberto 'Dani' Pendín Sánchez (born 29 October 1974) is an Argentine retired footballer who played as a central midfielder, currently the assistant manager of Spanish club RCD Espanyol.

He spent most of his 16-year career in Spain, appearing in 245 Segunda División games over the course of nine seasons (35 goals) while playing mainly for Xerez and Castellón.

Playing career
Pendín was born in Rosario, Santa Fe. A product of Newell's Old Boys' youth ranks he could never impose himself in its first team, also being loaned two times, including once in Uruguay with Huracán Buceo. Aged 23, he was released and moved to Spain with Real Oviedo Vetusta – Real Oviedo's reserves – never appearing officially for the main squad.

In the Segunda División B, Pendín played with Burgos CF, promoting in 2001 but being relegated the following year due to financial irregularities. He continued to be a regular the following seasons in Segunda División, with Andalusia's Xerez CD.

Aged already 32, Pendín moved to CD Castellón also in division two, making 95 competitive appearances for the Valencian side. After the club's relegation at the end of the 2009–10 campaign, the veteran continued in the country, signing with third-tier Pontevedra CF.

Pendín returned to football on 12 August 2013 after two years of inactivity, with the 38-year-old joining Xerez Deportivo FC in the regional leagues.

Coaching career
Pendín started working as a manager with his last club, still in amateur football. He later was part of former Xerez teammate Vicente Moreno's staffs at RCD Mallorca and RCD Espanyol.

References

External links

1974 births
Living people
Argentine people of Spanish descent
Footballers from Rosario, Santa Fe
Argentine footballers
Association football midfielders
Argentine Primera División players
Newell's Old Boys footballers
Huracán Buceo players
Central Córdoba de Rosario footballers
Segunda División players
Segunda División B players
Tercera División players
Divisiones Regionales de Fútbol players
Real Oviedo Vetusta players
Burgos CF footballers
Xerez CD footballers
CD Castellón footballers
Pontevedra CF footballers
San Fernando CD players
Xerez Deportivo FC footballers
Argentine expatriate footballers
Expatriate footballers in Uruguay
Expatriate footballers in Spain
Argentine expatriate sportspeople in Uruguay
Argentine expatriate sportspeople in Spain
Argentine football managers
Argentine expatriate football managers
Expatriate football managers in Spain